Rolf Björklund (born May 8, 1937 in Helsinki) is a Finnish sprint canoer who competed in the early 1960s. He was eliminated in the semifinals of the K-1 4 × 500 m event at the 1960 Summer Olympics in Rome.

References
Sports-reference.com profile

1937 births
Living people
Sportspeople from Helsinki
Canoeists at the 1960 Summer Olympics
Finnish male canoeists
Olympic canoeists of Finland